Sidney Fredrick Fournet (August 27, 1932 – April 23, 2011) was an American collegiate and professional American football player who played defensive lineman for three seasons with the Los Angeles Rams, and Pittsburgh Steelers of the NFL, and two seasons each for the American Football League's Dallas Texans, and New York Titans.  A two-way lineman who played guard and tackle in college at Louisiana State University, he was named to the 1954 College All-America team and was a two-time All-Southeastern Conference selection.

See also
 List of American Football League players
 1954 College Football All-America Team

References

External links

1932 births
2011 deaths
All-American college football players
People from Bogalusa, Louisiana
Players of American football from Louisiana
American football defensive tackles
American football offensive guards
American football defensive ends
LSU Tigers football players
Los Angeles Rams players
Pittsburgh Steelers players
Dallas Texans (AFL) players
New York Jets players
American Football League players